25 Años (Spanish) or 25 Anos (Portuguese) may refer to:

 25 Años (El Tri album)
 25 Años, an album by Flema
 25 Años, an album by El Chaqueño
 25 Anos, an album by Roberta Miranda
 25 Anos, an album by Tony Carreira

See also
 Celebracion de los 25 Años de Juan Gabriel en Bellas Artes
 25 Años en Directo, an album by Martirio